Anjum Anand (born 15 August 1971) is a British food writer and TV chef of Indian cuisine.

Biography
Anjum Anand grew up in London but has also lived and studied in Geneva, Paris, and Madrid. She speaks French and Spanish, holds a degree in European business administration from the European Business School London, and for a period ran a business importing flat-pack furniture from eastern Europe.

Her perspective on adapting healthy meals from a traditionally rich Indian diet came from personal experience of weight problems while growing up. Her diet consists of varied traditional dishes, recreated with wholesome ingredients and limited oil. At age 25 her first book Indian Every Day: Light Healthy Indian Food was published.

Anand became a regular guest on UKTV Food's Great Food Live from 2004 to 2007, and appeared in the BBC Two series Indian Food Made Easy broadcast in 2007. Her accent and flirtatious manner have led to her being dubbed "the Nigella Lawson of Indian cuisine in Britain".

She has been a regular contributor to The Times Online food pages since 2007. She has acted as consultant chef to Birds Eye brand to develop a range of healthy Indian ready meals. In September 2008 Anand published her third recipe book Anjum's New Indian, followed by a new BBC television series in November.

In mid-2011, she launched the brand The Spice Tailor, which makes Indian sauces. The brand was sold to Premier Foods in October 2022.

Personal life
In addition to England, Anand also owns family homes in both Delhi and Calcutta.

Published works
 Indian Every Day: Light, Healthy Indian Food (Headline Book Publishing)
 Indian Food Made Easy (2007, Quadrille Publishing)
 Anjum's New Indian (2008, Quadrille Publishing,
 Anjum's Eat Right For Your Body Type (2010, Quadrille Publishing,
 I Love Curry (2010, Quadrille Publishing,
 Anjum's Indian Vegetarian Feast (2012, Quadrille Publishing)

References

External links 

 
 

1971 births
Living people
Chefs of Indian cuisine
English Hindus
English chefs
English food writers
English people of Indian descent
English television chefs
Alumni of European Business School London
Punjabi people
Writers from London